Jessica Moore (born 16 August 1990) is a former professional tennis player from Australia.

Moore has won two doubles titles on the WTA Tour, as well as four singles and 31 doubles titles on the ITF Women's Circuit. On 27 October 2008, she reached her best singles ranking of world No. 132. On 13 May 2019, she peaked at No. 52 in the WTA doubles rankings.

Playing for Australia Fed Cup team, Moore has a win–loss record of 1–2.

Tennis career

2008–2009
Moore reached the second round of the 2008 Australian Open, wherein lost to 17th seed Shahar Pe'er. This made her the youngest Australian to win a match at the Australian Open since Jelena Dokić in 1999. Moore also reached the final of the 2008 Australian Open girls' singles, defeating future world No. 1, Simona Halep, in the semifinals. In the final, she lost to Arantxa Rus. She was the first Australian to make the final in 13 years.

After recovering from a shoulder injury, Moore won both the French Open and Wimbledon junior doubles titles with Slovenia's Polona Hercog. At the final Grand Slam tournament of the year, she reached the second round of the US Open after defeating American wildcard Melanie Oudin. However, she lost in the second round to Anna-Lena Grönefeld of Germany.

Moore was awarded a wildcard into the 2009 Australian Open after improving her ranking up 230 places to 140 in 2008. In the first round, she defeated fellow wildcard Christina McHale, before losing to 12th seed Flavia Pennetta.

2011
In February, Moore and Noppawan Lertcheewakarn reached the final of the Malaysian Open where they lost to Dinara Safina and Galina Voskoboeva. This was Moore's first WTA Tour tournament final.

She then competed in WTA qualifying events, and $100k and $50k events up until July, with a win–loss record of 10–12. After a few years of constantly being on the road, she decided to take an indefinite break and to experience what it was like to live an ordinary life.

Since 2015
Moore commenced 2015 by losing in qualifying rounds of the Sydney International and Australian Open before returning to the Australian circuit, where she made three consecutive quarterfinals in Clare, Port Pirie and Mildura (in February and March). Moore then headed to the USA and continued to play on the ITF Circuit. Following a quarterfinal result at Indian Harbour Beach, Moore's ranking re-entered the top 300.

In July 2016, she finally realized her first WTA tournament win. Partnering Varatchaya Wongteanchai, she won the Bucharest Open, defeating Alexandra Cadanțu and Katarzyna Piter in the final, in straight sets.

WTA career finals

Doubles: 5 (2 titles, 3 runner-ups)

ITF Circuit finals

Singles: 10 (4 titles, 6 runner-ups)

Doubles: 43 (31 titles, 12 runner-ups)

Junior Grand Slam finals

Girls' singles (0–1)

Girls' doubles (2–0)

References

External links
 
 
 
 

1990 births
Living people
Australian female tennis players
French Open junior champions
Grand Slam (tennis) champions in girls' doubles
Sportswomen from Western Australia
Tennis players at the 2010 Commonwealth Games
Wimbledon junior champions
Commonwealth Games silver medallists for Australia
Commonwealth Games medallists in tennis
Tennis players from Perth, Western Australia
Medallists at the 2010 Commonwealth Games